The 1946 Pepperdine Waves football team represented George Pepperdine College as an independent during the 1946 college football season. It was Pepperdine's first year of playing football. The Waves were led by first-year head coach Warren Gaer. Pepperdine finished the regular season 7–1 and defeated Nebraska Wesleyan in the 1947 Will Rogers Bowl.

Schedule

Notes

References

Pepperdine
Pepperdine Waves football seasons
Pepperdine Waves football